Daisy von Scherler Mayer, sometimes credited as Daisy Mayer (born September 14, 1966), is an American film and television director.

Life and career
Mayer is the daughter of actress Sasha von Scherler (1934–2000) and Paul Avila Mayer (1928–2009). Through her father, she was a grandchild of American screenwriter Edwin Justus Mayer, and through her mother, she was a grandchild of Prussian aristocrat Baron Walram Voystingus Albert Alexander von Schoeler.

After contributing to the New York Shakespeare Festival as a teen, von Scherler Mayer graduated from Wesleyan University with a degree in theater and history. Her experience with theater served as a foundation for her career as a director, where she applied her understanding of stage acting to her work for the screen. Upon graduating from Wesleyan, von Scherler Mayer directed contemporary interpretations of classic plays such as Euripides' Electra, and William Shakespeare's The Tempest and Two Gentlemen of Verona.

Von Scherler Mayer's feature-film directing debut was the 1995 film Party Girl. She also co-wrote the film, which starred Parker Posey and von Scherler Mayer's mother, with her partner Harry Birckmayer. The success of the film led to a television series starring Christine Taylor.

Since Party Girl, von Scherler Mayer has been writing and directing films as well as directing television productions. She directed Madeline, a 1998 film based on Ludwig Bemelmans' famous children's books about the adventures of a young redhaired French girl. Madeline starred Frances McDormand, Nigel Hawthorne, and Hatty Jones as Madeline.

Von Scherler Mayer is married to film composer David Carbonara, with whom she has two daughters.

Films
Party Girl (1995)
Woo (1998)
Madeline (1998)
The Guru (2002)
More of Me (2007)
Frenemies (2012)
Some Girl(s) (2013)

Television series
A Million Little Things
Aliens in America
Chuck
Crazy Ex-Girlfriend
Emily's Reasons Why Not
For the People
 Katie And Orbie 
The Loop
Mad Men 
Mozart in the Jungle
Nurse Jackie
Reverie
Shameless
Whiskey Cavalier
Zoey's Extraordinary Playlist
Jane by Design
Ben and Kate
Orange Is the New Black
Halt and Catch Fire
House of Lies
Ray Donovan
Doubt
The Walking Dead
Fear the Walking Dead
Bosch
Y: The Last Man
 Yellowjackets (episode "Doomcoming")

References

External links

1966 births
Living people
Screenwriters from New York (state)
American television directors
American women film directors
American women television directors
American people of German descent
Film directors from New York City
Wesleyan University alumni
American women screenwriters
21st-century American women
German nobility
Daisy